Warren E. Limmer (born January 24, 1955) is a Minnesota politician and member of the Minnesota Senate. A member of the Republican Party of Minnesota, he represents the 34th District, which includes portions of Hennepin County in the northwestern Twin Cities metropolitan area. Limmer previously served in the Minnesota House of Representatives, and in 1998 he sought the Republican endorsement for Minnesota Secretary of State, losing to Mary Kiffmeyer. He was the author of the 2012 Minnesota constitutional amendment to ban gay marriage.

Early life, education, and career
Limmer attended North Hennepin Community College, where he received an A.A., and St. Cloud State University, where he received a B.A. in criminal justice studies. He worked as a corrections officer before serving in the legislature. Limmer is a former member of the Hennepin County Corrections Advisory Commission and the Crystal Human Rights Commission. He now works as a real estate agent..

Minnesota Legislature
Before being elected to the Minnesota Senate, Limmer was a member of the Minnesota House of Representatives, first elected in 1988 in the old House District 48A, and reelected in 1990, 1992 and 1994. After the 1992 redistricting, the area became House District 33B.

Limmer was first elected to the Senate in a February 1995 special election held after Senator Patrick McGowan resigned upon being elected Hennepin County Sheriff. Limmer has been continuously reelected since, running unopposed in 2010. He served as an assistant minority leader from 2005 to 2006. His special legislative concerns include criminal justice, public education, safe school legislation, economic development, and tax reform.

On April 27, 2011, Limmer introduced a bill to propose a referendum on an amendment to the Minnesota Constitution banning same-sex marriage. The bill passed, and Minnesota voters rejected the amendment in the 2012 general election by six percentage points.

Also in 2012 voters rejected Republicans' attempt to require government-issued identification to vote, siding with amendment opponents who argued that Voter ID would disproportionately suppress votes of immigrants, the elderly, disabled people and communities of color, and elected a Democratic majority in both the House and Senate, throwing Republicans out after only two years in the majority in both chambers—a result considered to be electoral backlash to Republican overreach.

In the following legislative session DFL Senator Scott Dibble and DFL Representative Karen Clark introduced bills to legalize same-sex marriage in Minnesota. The Minnesota House of Representatives voted 75–59 in favor of legalization. A few days later, after debate on the Senate floor, the body also voted for legalization, 37–30. On May 14, 2013, in front of a crowd of 7,000 people on the Capitol Mall in St. Paul, Governor Mark Dayton signed Dibble's and Clark's marriage equality bill into law, making Minnesota the 12th state to legalize gay marriage.

Limmer opposes universal background checks for gun purchases. As chair of the Senate Judiciary's public safety committee, he has refused to allow any hearings on gun safety.

Personal life
Limmer and his wife Lori live in Maple Grove and have three children.

References

External links

Minnesota State Senator Warren Limmer Campaign website
Minnesota State Senator Warren Limmer Legislative website
Minnesota Public Radio Votetracker: Senator Warren Limmer
Project Vote Smart - Senator Warren Limmer Profile

|-

1955 births
21st-century American politicians
American people of German descent
American prison officers
Living people
Republican Party Minnesota state senators
People from Maple Grove, Minnesota
Presidents of the Minnesota Senate
St. Cloud State University alumni